Sayonara Su'a (born September 28, 1969) is a former rugby union player. She made her debut for New Zealand on 31 August 1996 against Australia at Sydney. She made her only international try for the Black Ferns in their demolition of France in 1996 at Edmonton. She scored one of 17 tries that day in their 109–0 victory.

She briefly coached Messina in the 2000–2001 Serie A season. In 2003, she played in a World XV's team that took on the Black Ferns in Whangārei.

References

External links 

 Black Ferns Profile

1969 births
Living people
New Zealand women's international rugby union players
New Zealand female rugby union players